Shyampur may refer to 
 Salempur Rajputana, a census town in Haridwar district of Uttarakhand
 Shyampur, Bangladesh, a neighbourhood in Dhaka, Bangladesh
 Shyampur I (community development block), in West Bengal, India
 Shyampur II (community development block), in West Bengal, India
 Shyampur (Vidhan Sabha constituency), an assembly constituency in Howrah district
 Shyampur, Bhopal, a village in Madhya Pradesh, India
 Shyampur, Uttar Pradesh , a village in Uttar Pradesh, India
 Shyampur, Bankura, a village in West Bengal, India
 Shyampur, Magrahat, a census town in South 24 Parganas district, West Bengal, India